Laabam is a 2021 Indian Tamil-language action drama film written and directed by S. P. Jananathan. It stars Vijay Sethupathi and Jagapathi Babu with Shruti Haasan, Dhansika, and Kalaiyarasan in pivotal roles. Ramji was hired as cinematographer, while D. Imman is the music composer. Principal photography for Laabam commenced on 22 April 2019. The film was released theatrically on 9 September 2021. It received mixed to negative reviews from critics and audiences and became a box-office bomb. This would be Jananathan's final film as a director and a posthumous release.

Plot 

Pakkiri returns to his native place after an exile and straight away takes on the village head Vanagamudi. With the support of the locals, he becomes the president of the village and decides to give agriculture a new touch with his techniques. The rest of the story is about how Pakkiri manages the local goons with the help of Clara and comes out victorious.

Cast

Production 
The film is directed by S. P. Jananathan, who made a brief comeback into direction since working for Purampokku Engira Podhuvudamai, which released in 2015. Principal photography for Laabam commenced on 22 April 2019. Vijay Sethupathi was cast as in a male lead role to play a social activist.

Jananathan died on 14 March 2021 during the post-production stage, thus making Laabam his final film as a director.

Soundtrack 
The music was composed by D. Imman, collaborating with Vijay Sethupathi for the fourth time (after Rummy, Rekka and Karuppan) and Jananathan for the first and only time. The audio rights were acquired by Lahari Music and T-Series.
Yaazha Yaazha - Shruti Haasan
Yaamili Yaamiliya - Divya Kumar
Clara My Name Is Clara - Sunidhi Chauhan, Kpy Naveen
Seruvom Seruvom - CLEO VII, Srinisha Jayaseelan
Uzhaippom Thozha - Sreenidhi, Narayanan Ravishankar

Critical reception
The Times of India wrote, "The film's narrative is quite fractured. Rather than moving from one incident to the other, here, it moves from one issue to the other at a rapid pace giving us a false sense of momentum." The Hindu called it "more a visual representation of a protagonist in a television programme [..] than a film".

Home media
The film is available on online streaming platform Netflix.

References

External links 

Films directed by S. P. Jananathan
Films scored by D. Imman
Indian action drama films
Films about agriculture